Nairy Baghramian (born 1971) is an Iranian-born German visual artist. Since 1984, she has lived and worked in Berlin. 

When the Solomon R. Guggenheim Museum selected Baghramian as a finalist for the 2020 Hugo Boss Prize, they described Baghramian’s statues as: "...[Exploring] the workings of the body, gender, and public and private space."

Biography 
Nairy Baghramian was born 1971, in Isfahan, Iran. She relocated to Germany in 1985, as a teenager. She attended Berlin University of the Arts (Universität der Künste Berlin).

Work 
Baghramian captures fleeting human poses in traditional materials such as marble and steel. Inspired by dance classes she took as a child, Baghramian recalls her teacher speaking of the need to break down human movement into discrete elements. Her work depicts abstract forms of bodies or body parts, often contemplating the brokenness or "prosthetic" relationship between the body and its environment. In the Guggenheim video, Baghramian explains that sometimes she builds on the idea of "looking at something and feeling pity for it." In addition, her work creates interplay between the work itself and the spaces in which it exists.  

For the Berlin Biennial she collaborated with ninety-eight-year-old designer Janette Laverrière to create a set for her furniture design. 

In 2017, Baghramian's exhibition, Déformation Professionnelle was at display in the Stedelijk Museum voor Actuele Kunst. This exhibition is culmination of the artist's 18 sets of works from 1999 to 2016. Déformation Professionnelle exhibits the artist's oeuvre while alluding to other existing works in her field. By using sculpture elements and photography in a site-responsive practice she questions the traditional views towards the relationship between the human body's gestures and its functions.

In 2021 it was announced the Baghramian had received the 2022 Nasher Prize presented by the Nasher Sculpture Center in Dallas.

Exhibitions

2019: SOFT POWER, San Francisco Museum of Modern Art, San Francisco, California, United States;
 2017: documenta 14, Athens, Greece and Kassel, Germany;
2017: Déformation Professionelle, Museum der Moderne, Salzburg, Austria;
 2016: S.M.A.K. Museum of Contemporary Art, Ghent, Belgium;
 2015: Nairy Baghramian: Hand Me Down, Museo Tamayo, Mexico City, Mexico;
 2014: Sonae/Serralves Project 2014: Nairy Baghramian, Serralves Museum, Porto, Portugal;
 2014: Nairy Baghramian: French Curve/Slip of the Tongue, Bluhm Family Terrace, Art Institute of Chicago, Chicago, Illinois, United States;
 2014: Nairy Baghramian: Off the Rack, Neuer Berliner Kunstverein, Berlin, Germany;
 2013: Retainer, Sculpture Center, Long Island City, New York, United States;
 2013: Nairy Baghramian: Fluffing the Pillows (Moorings, gurneys, Silos, Mops, News Rack, Railing), MIT List Visual Arts Center, Cambridge, United States;
 2012: Nairy Baghramian: Class Reunion, The Contemporary Art Gallery, Vancouver, Canada;
 2012: Fluffing the Pillows, Kunsthalle Mannheim, Mannheim, Germany

Awards 
 2022 - Nasher Prize, Dallas Texas;
 2020 - Hugo Boss Prize;
 2016 – Zurich Art Prize, Zurich, Switzerland;
 2014 – Arnold-Bode Prize, Kassel, Germany;
 2012 – Hector Prize, Kunsthalle Mannheim, Mannheim, Germany;
 2007 – Ernst Schering Foundation Award

References

Further reading 
 Kostas Prapoglu (20 September 2016). "Nairy Baghramian". The Seen.
 Kevin McGarry (28 January 2013). "Nairy Baghramian at Sculpture Center". T Magazine.

1971 births
Living people
20th-century Iranian women artists
21st-century Iranian women artists
Artists from Isfahan
Artists from Berlin
Iranian people of Armenian descent
Ethnic Armenian artists
Iranian contemporary artists
German contemporary artists
Iranian emigrants to Germany